This is the list of cathedrals in the Bahamas sorted by denomination.

Anglican
Christ Church Cathedral, Nassau (Church in the Province of the West Indies)

Roman Catholic 
Cathedrals of the Roman Catholic Church in the Bahamas:
St. Francis Xavier Cathedral, Nassau

See also

List of cathedrals

References

Cathedrals
Cathedrals in the Bahamas
Bahamas
Cathedrals